Bill Black (19 February 1928 – 9 May 2019) was a Scotland international rugby union player who played at prop.

Rugby union career

Amateur career
Black played for Glasgow HSFP.

Provincial career
Black played for Glasgow District.

International career
He was capped a total of five times for the Scotland international team.

References

Sources

 Bath, Richard (ed.) The Scotland Rugby Miscellany (Vision Sports Publishing Ltd, 2007 )
 Cotton, Fran (Ed.) (1984) The Book of Rugby Disasters & Bizarre Records. Compiled by Chris Rhys. London. Century Publishing. 
 Jones, J.R. Encyclopedia of Rugby Union Football (Robert Hale, London, 1976 )
 Massie, Allan A Portrait of Scottish Rugby (Polygon, Edinburgh)

1928 births
2019 deaths
Glasgow District (rugby union) players
Glasgow HSFP players
Rugby union players from Rutherglen
Scotland international rugby union players
Scottish rugby union players
Rugby union props